The Anti-Drug Secretariat was a provincial government agency in Ontario, Canada, from 1989 to 1992. It was led by a member of the Executive Council of Ontario, who was styled as the Minister responsible for the provincial anti-drug strategy.

The first minister to hold this position was Ken Black, who also served as Minister of Tourism and Recreation in the government of David Peterson. Black had previously authored a report on the province's anti-drug strategy and served as the premier's advisor on drug issues. Following his appointment, he was responsible for coordinating anti-drug strategies within seven government ministries.

The agency was restructured as the Office of Substance Abuse Strategy in 1992. It appears to have been quietly phased out in 1993, with most of its responsibilities transferred to the Ministry of Health.

Ministers responsible for the provincial anti-drug strategy

Ministers responsible for the substance abuse strategy

References

Defunct Ontario government departments and agencies
1989 establishments in Ontario
1993 disestablishments in Ontario